Roman Ihorovych Didyk (born 2 December 2002) is a Ukrainian professional footballer who plays as a centre-back for Rukh Lviv.

Career
On 23 July 2021, he moved to Rukh Lviv, and made his league debut two days after in the losing match against Metalist 1925 Kharkiv in the 2021–22 Ukrainian Premier League.

References

External links
 
 
 Дідик Роман Ігорович  at the Ukrainian Premier League

2002 births
Living people
Sportspeople from Lviv
Ukrainian footballers
Ukraine youth international footballers
Ukraine under-21 international footballers
Association football defenders
FC Ahrobiznes Volochysk players
FC Rukh Lviv players
Ukrainian Premier League players
Ukrainian First League players